David Henry Crowley (September 5, 1882December 21, 1951) was a Michigan lawyer and politician.

Early life and education
David H. Crowley was born on September 5, 1882 in Leslie, Michigan to parents Daniel Crowley and Margaret Crowley. In 1905, David earned a LL.B. from the University of Michigan Law School.

Career
In June 1905, Crowley was admitted to the State Bar of Michigan. Crowley served as Cheboygan County Prosecuting Attorney from 1909 to December 1912. Crowley served as Assistant Michigan Attorney General from January 13, 1913 to November 1, 1916. Crowley served as Michigan Railroad Commissioner from November 10, 1916 until his resignation in January 1917. Crowley resigned to practice law in Detroit as a member of the law firm Monaghan, Monaghan, O'Brien & Crowley, which later became Monaghan, Crowley, Reilly & Kellogg and then became Monaghan, Crowley, Clark & Kellogg. Crowley served as special counsel for Detroit in public utility matters from 1918 to 1933. On April 1, 1935, Crowley was elected as a regent member of University of Michigan board of regents, a position he served in from 1936 to 1943. After the resignation of Michigan Attorney General Harry S. Toy, Crowley was appointed by Governor Frank Fitzgerald to fill the vacancy. In 1936, Crowley tried to keep his position as attorney general, but was defeated in the election.

Personal life
On August 17, 1909, Crowley married Nina C. Barrett in Cheboygan, Michigan. Together, they had two children. Crowley was a member of the Detroit Athletic Club, the Knights of Columbus, and the Elks Lodge.

Death
Crowley died on December 21, 1951 in Detroit. He was buried at Birmingham, Michigan.

References

1882 births
1951 deaths
Burials in Michigan
County officials in Michigan
Lawyers from Detroit
Michigan Attorneys General
Michigan Republicans
People from Cheboygan County, Michigan
People from Leslie, Michigan
Politicians from Detroit
Regents of the University of Michigan
University of Michigan Law School alumni
20th-century American lawyers
20th-century American politicians
20th-century American academics